Martín Sebastián Rodríguez Prantl (born 20 September 1989) is a Uruguayan footballer who plays as a goalkeeper. Besides Uruguay, he has played in Colombia and Brazil.

References

External links

1989 births
Living people
Uruguayan footballers
Uruguayan expatriate footballers
Association football goalkeepers
Pan American Games medalists in football
Pan American Games bronze medalists for Uruguay
Medalists at the 2011 Pan American Games
Footballers at the 2011 Pan American Games
Montevideo Wanderers F.C. players
Juventud de Las Piedras players
Deportivo Pereira footballers
Racing Club de Montevideo players
Esporte Clube Vitória players
Operário Ferroviário Esporte Clube players
Santa Cruz Futebol Clube players
Club Nacional de Football players
Uruguayan Primera División players
Categoría Primera B players
Campeonato Brasileiro Série B players
Uruguayan expatriate sportspeople in Colombia
Uruguayan expatriate sportspeople in Brazil
Expatriate footballers in Colombia
Expatriate footballers in Brazil